State Route 71 (SR 71) is a primary state highway in the southwest part of the U.S. state of Virginia. It runs from Gate City northeast to Lebanon, mostly through river valleys. Despite running more east–west than north–south, it is signed north–south; it parallels the similarly-oriented U.S. Route 11 and Interstate 81.

Route description

SR 71 begins in Gate City, Scott County where U.S. Routes 23/58/421 Business leaves Jackson Street to head southeast through Moccasin Gap. It runs in a general east-northeasterly direction, soon joining Big Moccasin Creek. The road and creek run through the Moccasin Valley past Slabtown (where SR 72 begins) to Snowflake, where SR 71 leaves the creek to cross Moccasin Ridge. SR 71 leaves the ridge at Dorton Fort and enters the valley formed by Copper Creek, running past Nickelsville.

SR 71 continues in Russell County in a general east-northeasterly direction past Grassy Creek to U.S. Route 58 Alternate at Parsonage. The routes overlap to Dickensonville, where SR 71 splits, continuing to follow Copper Creek to near its source, passing over a small summit, and then following small creeks to its end at US 19 Bus. in Lebanon.

History
In the 1933 renumbering, SR 107 was renumbered SR 71 and extended east from Parsonage along former SR 11 (renumbered SR 64 then) to Dickensonville, replacing the former SR 110 from there to US 19 at Hansonville. As part of the 1940 renumbering, which coordinated numbers with adjacent states, SR 64 and SR 71 were swapped east of Dickensonville, giving SR 71 its present terminus at Lebanon.

Major intersections

References

External links

Virginia Highways Project: VA 71

071
State Route 071
State Route 071